The Robert Dilworth House is a historic house located at 606 East Fifth Street in Vermont, Illinois. The house was built in 1872 for Robert Dilworth, a local banker, politician, and pharmacist. The house was designed in the Italianate style, a nationally popular architectural style at the time. The main entrance is situated behind a full-length front porch supported by beveled columns; the front door itself has a decorative wooden surround and is topped by a transom. The house's windows are tall, narrow, and topped by arches, as is common in Italianate architecture. The gable roof has a front-facing gable adorned by decorative brackets along its eaves.

The house was added to the National Register of Historic Places on November 12, 1993.

References

Houses on the National Register of Historic Places in Illinois
Italianate architecture in Illinois
Houses completed in 1872
National Register of Historic Places in Fulton County, Illinois
Vermont, Illinois